Orașu Nou is a commune of 7,100 inhabitants situated in Satu Mare County, Romania. 

It is composed of five villages:

The villages of Racșa and Racșa-Vii were part of Orașu Nou from 1925 to 1949 and from 1956 to 2010, when they were split off to form Racșa Commune.

Orașu Nou is located in the northeastern part of the county, in the Oaș Country ethnographic region, on the border with Maramureș County. The commune is traversed by national road , which connects it to the county seat, Satu Mare,  to the west.

Demographics
Ethnic groups (2002 census): 
Romanians: 63.37%
Hungarians: 34.53%
Roma: 4.78%

According to mother tongue, 63.40% of the population speak Romanian, while 36.43% speak Hungarian as their first language.

References

Communes in Satu Mare County